Gita Gopinath (born 8 December 1971) is an Indian-American economist who has served as the first deputy managing director of the International Monetary Fund (IMF), since 21 January 2022. She had previously served as chief economist of the IMF between 2019 and 2022.

Prior to joining the IMF, Gopinath had a two-decade-long career as an academic including at the economics department of Harvard University where she was the John Zwaanstra Professor of International Studies and Economics (2005-2022) and earlier an assistant professor at the University of Chicago Booth School of Business (2001-05). She is also a co-director of the international finance and macroeconomics program at the National Bureau of Economic Research and has earlier worked as the honorary economic adviser to the Chief Minister of Kerala.

Gopinath was appointed as chief economist of the IMF in October 2018 by its managing director Christine Lagarde. In an interview with Trevor Noah on The Daily Show, she named the worldwide recession of 2020 as "The Great Lockdown". In December 2021, IMF Managing Director Kristalina Georgieva appointed her the first deputy managing director of the IMF, which is the organization's number-two position.

Early life and education 
Gita Gopinath was born on 8 December 1971 in Kolkata, India in a Malayali family. She is the younger of two daughters of T.V. Gopinath and V.C. Vijayalakshmi. Her family is related to the late A. K. Gopalan.

Gopinath studied at Nirmala Convent School in Mysore. She received a B.A. degree from Lady Shri Ram College for Women of the University of Delhi in 1992 and an M.A. degree in economics from Delhi School of Economics, also of the University of Delhi, in 1994. She further completed an M.A. degree at the University of Washington in 1996. She earned her Ph.D. in economics from Princeton University in 2001 after completing a doctoral dissertation titled "Three essays on international capital flows: a search theoretic approach", under the supervision of Ben Bernanke, Kenneth Rogoff and Pierre-Olivier Gourinchas. She was awarded the Princeton's Woodrow Wilson Fellowship Research Award while doing her doctoral research at Princeton.

Career 
In 1992, Gopinath got her B.A degree in economics from University of Delhi. In 1994 she earned her first master's degree at the Delhi School of Economics. In 1996, she got her second master's degree in economics at the University of Washington. In 2001 she earned her Ph.D. in economics in the field of international macroeconomics and trade at Princeton University. At Princeton's economics department, her Ph.D. advisors included two future chief economists of the IMF - Ken Rogoff (2001-2003) and Pierre-Olivier Gourinchas (2022-2025) and a future chair of the Board of Governors of the Federal Reserve - Professor Ben Bernanke (2006-2014). 

In 2001, she joined the University of Chicago's Booth School of Business as an assistant professor. In 2005 she moved to Harvard University's economics department where she was the John Zwanstra Professor of International Studies and Economics through 2022.

In October 2018, Gopinath was appointed chief economist of the International Monetary Fund. As part of her many significant initiatives, she co-authored the "Pandemic Paper" on how to end the COVID-19 pandemic that set globally endorsed targets for vaccinating the world. This work led to the creation of the Multilateral Task Force made up of the leadership of the IMF, World Bank, WTO, and WHO to help end the pandemic and the establishment of a working group with vaccine manufacturers to identify trade barriers, supply bottlenecks, and accelerate delivery of vaccines to low- and lower-middle income countries. Gopinath also worked with other IMF departments to connect with policy makers, academics, and other stakeholders on a new analytical approach to help countries respond to international capital flows via the Integrated Policy Framework. She also helped set up a Climate Change team inside the IMF to analyze, among other things, optimal climate mitigation policies. IMF Managing Director Kristalina Georgieva noted that "Gita's contribution to the Fund and our membership has been truly remarkable —quite simply, her impact on the IMF's work has been tremendous. She made history as the first female Chief Economist of the Fund and we benefitted immensely from her sharp intellect and deep knowledge of international finance and macroeconomics as we navigate through the worst economic crisis since the Great Depression." 

In December 2021, Gopinath was elevated as the fund's new first deputy managing director (FDMD), the number two position at the fund. Gopinath had been earlier scheduled to return to her academic position at Harvard University in January 2022 on completion of her term as chief economist. Georgieva added that "given that the pandemic has led to an increase in the scale and scope of the macroeconomic challenges facing our member countries, Gita—universally recognized as one of the world's leading macroeconomists—has precisely the expertise that we need for the FDMD role at this point. Indeed, her particular skill set—combined with her years of experience at the Fund as Chief Economist—make her uniquely well qualified. She is the right person at the right time."

As the first deputy managing director of the IMF, Gopinath represents the fund at multilateral forums, maintains high-level contacts with member governments and board members, the media, and other institutions, leads the fund's work on surveillance and related policies, oversees research and flagship publications and the work of senior staff.

Gopinath was earlier the co-director of the international finance and macroeconomics program at the National Bureau of Economic Research, a visiting scholar at the Federal Reserve Bank of Boston, a member of the economic advisory panel of the Federal Reserve Bank of New York, economic adviser to the Chief Minister of Kerala, a co-editor at the American Economic Review, and a co-editor of the 2019 edition of the Handbook of International Economics.

In June 2021, Gopinath was appointed to the World Bank–International Monetary Fund High-Level Advisory Group (HLAG) on Sustainable and Inclusive Recovery and Growth, co-chaired by Mari Pangestu, Ceyla Pazarbasioglu, and Nicholas Stern.

Honors 
In 2021, Financial Times named Gopinath among the "25 most influential women of the year", the International Economic Association named her the Schumpeter-Haberler Distinguished Fellow, the Agricultural & Applied Economics Association recognized her with the John Kenneth Galbraith Award, and the Carnegie Corporation named her among "Great (American) Immigrants". She was named among the Bloomberg "50 people who defined 2019" and among the "Women who Broke Major Barriers to Become Firsts" by Time magazine. 

In 2018, Gopinath was elected a fellow of the American Academy of Arts and Sciences and the Econometric Society. Foreign Policy named her one of the Top Global Thinkers in 2019. In 2017, she received the Distinguished Alumnus Award from the University of Washington. She was named one of the top 25 economists under 45 by the International Monetary Fund in 2014 and was chosen as a Young Global Leader by the World Economic Forum in 2011. In 2019, she was awarded the Pravasi Bharatiya Samman by the President of India.

Personal life 
Gopinath is a naturalized American citizen and an overseas citizen of India. She is married to Iqbal Singh Dhaliwal, her classmate from the Delhi School of Economics. The couple together have a son (born 2002) named Rahil.

References

External links 

Profile at International Monetary Fund
Harvard University Profile

1971 births
20th-century American businesswomen
20th-century American businesspeople
20th-century American economists
20th-century Indian businesspeople
20th-century Indian businesswomen
20th-century Indian economists
20th-century Indian journalists
20th-century Indian women scientists
20th-century Indian women writers
21st-century American businesswomen
21st-century American businesspeople
21st-century American economists
21st-century Indian businesspeople
21st-century Indian businesswomen
21st-century Indian economists
21st-century Indian journalists
21st-century Indian women scientists
American editors
American women economists
American women editors
American social sciences writers
Businesspeople from Mysore
Businesswomen from Karnataka
Delhi University alumni
Educators from Karnataka
Fellows of the American Academy of Arts and Sciences
Fellows of the Econometric Society
Harvard University faculty
Indian editors
Indian emigrants to the United States
Indian social sciences writers
Indian women economists
Indian women editors
Indian women science writers
International Monetary Fund people
Journalists from Karnataka
Living people
Indian Hindus
American Hindus
Naturalized citizens of the United States
Recipients of Pravasi Bharatiya Samman
Scholars from Mysore
Women educators from Karnataka
Women scientists from Karnataka
Writers from Mysore
American people of Indian descent
Indian economists